Stefán Kristjánsson (30 June 1924 – 1 September 1990) was an Icelandic alpine skier. He competed at the 1952 Winter Olympics and the 1956 Winter Olympics.

References

1924 births
1990 deaths
Stefán Kristjánsson
Stefán Kristjánsson
Alpine skiers at the 1952 Winter Olympics
Alpine skiers at the 1956 Winter Olympics
20th-century Icelandic people